Kenneth P. Green is an environmental scientist and director at the Fraser Institute.

Education and career 
Green holds a Bachelor of Science degree in Biology from University of California, Los Angeles; a Master of Science in Genetics from San Diego State University; and a Doctorate of Environmental Science and Engineering (D.Env.) from University of California, Los Angeles.

Green's research has focused on energy and environmental policy at think tanks in North America. After completing his doctoral degree in 1994, he studied environmental policy at the Libertarian Reason Foundation in California. He then spent three years studying Canadian and American environmental policy at the fiscally-conservative Fraser Institute in Vancouver, British Columbia. On returning to the United States, Green was executive director of the Environmental Literacy Council for one year before joining the American Enterprise Institute in 2006. He returned to Canada in 2013, becoming Senior Director, Energy and Natural Resources of the Fraser Institute. There, his research concerned energy and natural resource policy.

Green has also served on advisory and review boards.  From 1996 to 1999, he was a member of the California REACH Commission, and from 1996 to 2001, he was a member of the California Departmental Transportation Advisory Committee. He has twice served as expert reviewer for publications of the United Nations Intergovernmental Panel on Climate Change Working Group, including a 1999 special report on aviation and the global atmosphere, and a 2001 volume on the science of climate change.

Green's work has appeared in National Review, Financial Times, Wall Street Journal, Financial Post, Washington Post, Pittsburgh Post-Gazette, and the Los Angeles Times. He has written policy analyses, articles in popular magazine, opinion columns, book chapters, and a textbook for middle-school students entitled Global Warming: Understanding the Debate. In 2011, he published a supplementary textbook for college students studying energy and energy policy, Abundant Energy: Fuel of Human Flourishing. Green has been a guest on talk radio and television news programs, and has given presentations on public policy to student groups, business groups, and legislative staff. He has testified before local, regional, and national regulatory and legislative bodies, including appearances before committees of both houses of the United States Congress, the U.S. Senate Committee on Finance, U.S. Senate Committee on Environment and Public Works, and U.S. House Select Committee on Energy Independence and Global Warming.

In 2011, in written testimony to the United States Senate's Health, Education, Labor and Pensions Committee he said "In conclusion, the idea that government can create jobs in the economy is a myth." During Committee questioning he conceded "It would be absurd to say the government cannot create jobs."

In 2012, he co-authored an article with Steven F. Hayward entitled, 'Market-Friendly Energy', in The 4% Solution: Unleashing the Economic Growth America Needs, published by the George W. Bush Presidential Center.

Views 
Green describes himself as “a free-market environmentalist,” and believes that most environmental problems stem from an absence of properly defined and enforced property rights, and/or insufficient societal wealth to afford environmental protection. He has testified that although he believes the environment worth protecting such environmental protection must not harm other American values considered cardinal such as property rights, due process, economic freedom, individual liberty, and personal responsibility.

On climate change, Green has repeatedly stated that he believes the climate is warming, and greenhouse gases are partially responsible. He is, however skeptical of computer models that contain unsubstantiated assumptions about positive feedback loops, and he has expressed contempt for computerized projections of future or regional climate change, comparing them to “computerized horoscopes.” Green has testified that as no technology currently exists to significantly and affordably reduce greenhouse gas emissions in the near term, he favors an agenda of adaptation and resilience-building. To hedge against the risk of more extreme climate change, Green favors increased research into geoengineering.

Concerning energy policy, Green considers himself an “energy realist,” and does not believe there are currently technologies that can substantially or affordably substitute for conventional energy sources such as coal, nuclear power, oil, and natural gas. To the extent that such alternatives do exist, Green has shown they pose environmental and economic challenges, and he believes they should not be hastily adopted without considering potential unintended adverse consequences.

See also 
 List of American Enterprise Institute scholars and fellows

References

External links
 https://web.archive.org/web/20130313175028/http://www.commondreams.org/headlines07/0202-05.htm
 

Environmental scientists
Living people
University of California, Los Angeles alumni
Year of birth missing (living people)